Trigonoptera sulcata is a species of beetle in the family Cerambycidae. It was described by Per Olof Christopher Aurivillius in 1924.

Subspecies
 Trigonoptera sulcata sulcata Aurivillius, 1924
 Trigonoptera sulcata reversa Gilmour, 1950

References

Tmesisternini
Beetles described in 1924